Aurelio Moyano (1 August 1938 – 3 July 2020) was an Argentine footballer who played midfielder.

He arrived in Europe in 1961 and attempted to join Inter Milan, however he failed to make the club's roster. After this rejection, he joined FC Nancy and helped the club become finalists for the Coupe de France, playing in 13 matches and scoring two goals. In 1964, he was transferred to AS Cannes in Ligue 2, where the team finished 11th that season. He played for AS Aix-en-Provence from 1964 to 1965 and AC Ajaccio from 1965 to 1967.

References

1938 births
2020 deaths
AS Béziers Hérault (football) players
AC Ajaccio players
AS Cannes players
FC Nancy players
Argentine footballers
Association football midfielders
Footballers from Córdoba, Argentina
Argentine expatriate sportspeople in France
Argentine expatriate footballers
Expatriate footballers in France